A guerrilla crosswalk is a pedestrian crossing that has been modified or created without jurisdictional approval, and with the intent of improving pedestrian and other non-automobile safety. These interventions are a common strategy within tactical urbanism, a type of low-cost, often temporary change to the built environment intended to improve local livability. Guerilla crosswalks have been noted in news articles since at least 2009 and have become more well known as an urban strategy in recent years.

Background
Walkability and quality of life indicators are common topics in urban planners' and urban advocates' vocabulary in recent years. With the increasing body of research focused on measuring, and in some cases, marketing the walkability and quality of life in cities, citizens and decision-makers alike are focused on improving intersections, sidewalks, and streetscapes. Tactical urbanism is focused generally on small-scale, quick, and low-cost changes to a place. While some might consider it illegal, it is utilized by both activists and city planners alike when pilot programs and improvements are required immediately and when budget is a significant constraint. 

Many guerrilla tactics react to the delays and inefficiencies in attempting to follow proper or legal channels. For example, when local residents appeal to a public works department for an additional crosswalk near a school, impatience will inevitably set in after a time of unresponsiveness. Sometimes an act such as painting an unsanctioned crosswalk is the only response that will move some jurisdictions to action.

This tactic is often a response to unsafe conditions at the interface of pedestrian and automobile circulation and is not without its opponents. One Public Works official commented in this way, "These changes to City streets are illegal, potentially unsafe and adding to the City's costs of maintenance and repair…. There is potential liability and risk management claims to both the City and the individuals involved." Crosswalks are a signal to drivers that pedestrians may be present. They are intended to group pedestrians for crossing at a safe time. The introduction of new crosswalks can be confusing to drivers and potentially give pedestrians a false sense of security.

Etymology
The Oxford English Dictionary's definition of guerilla includes: "referring to actions or activities performed in an impromptu way, often without authorization."

Case studies and examples

In the Baltimore neighborhood known as Hampden, a 2011 repaving project endured longer than planned. After paving was complete, new crosswalks should have been painted, but the task was left undone with the contractor's justification that the cold weather prevented any street striping. This busy intersection was determined unsafe by many of the locals. Eventually one resident took it upon himself to take action. As he painted the crosswalk lines late into the night, he noticed that cops passed by but no citation was ever given. The local city council woman rather than pursue some level of prosecution actually offered a hearty "thank you."

Honolulu, Hawaii has some of the highest pedestrian fatality rates in the United States. (Wong 2012)  Many of their busiest intersections reflect city standards from years past without modification as the quantity of vehicular traffic and associated speeds have changed dramatically. Some residents chose to take a stand in 2014. Within the crosswalk of one of these busy intersections, residents altered the crosswalk lines so that they spelled out "Aloha," the traditional Hawaiian salutation. While the perpetrators sought to introduce a level of humanity to the dangerous location, city officials stated that the change was a "deviation from the standard."

More recently, Chicago has seen a different level of activism to protect pedestrians within an existing crosswalk. In Spring of 2016, the city of Chicago posted signage to a unique intersection: no left turn. To call attention to this new condition, an unknown person installed two small planter boxes within the crosswalk with flowering plants. Many responded positively while local businesses expressed concern for the traffic pattern change and its effect on their business.

References

Further reading 

 

Pedestrian activism
Pedestrian crossings
Urban planning
Walking
DIY culture